Paul Ballard (born 4 September 1984) is a rugby league footballer for the Crusaders in the Super League, as a .

He has previously played for Leigh Centurions, Oldham RLFC (Heritage № 1286) and also Widnes Vikings in the Super League.

He re-signed with the Crusaders for the 2009 season.

References

External links
Celtic Crusaders profile
Leigh Centurions profile
Statistics at rugbyleagueproject.org
(archived by web.archive.org) SL stats

1984 births
Living people
Blackpool Panthers players
Crusaders Rugby League players
English rugby league players
Leigh Leopards players
Oldham R.L.F.C. players
Rugby articles needing expert attention
Rugby league wingers
Whitehaven R.L.F.C. players
Widnes Vikings players